The Bank Crash of Unter den Linden is a 1926 German silent film directed by Paul Merzbach and starring Alfred Abel, Hans Albers, and Margarete Schlegel. It was produced by the German subsidiary of the Fox Film Company.

The film's sets were designed by the art director Gustav A. Knauer.

Cast
In alphabetical order

References

Bibliography

External links

1926 films
Films of the Weimar Republic
Films directed by Paul Merzbach
German silent feature films
German black-and-white films